Kalervo Kinos (16 January 1906 – 24 January 1984) was a Finnish gymnast. He competed in seven events at the 1928 Summer Olympics.

References

1906 births
1984 deaths
Finnish male artistic gymnasts
Olympic gymnasts of Finland
Gymnasts at the 1928 Summer Olympics
Gymnasts from Tampere
20th-century Finnish people